Taylor Mabika (born 29 January 1975) is a Gabonese professional boxer who held the African cruiserweight title from 2013 to 2014. As an amateur, he competed in the men's light heavyweight event at the 2004 Summer Olympics.

References

External links
 

1975 births
Living people
Gabonese male boxers
Olympic boxers of Gabon
Boxers at the 2004 Summer Olympics
Light-heavyweight boxers
Cruiserweight boxers
African Boxing Union champions
Sportspeople from Libreville
21st-century Gabonese people